The Boston Journal was a daily newspaper published in Boston, Massachusetts, from 1833 until October 1917 when it was merged with the Boston Herald.

The paper was originally an evening paper called the Evening Mercantile Journal. When it started publishing its morning edition, it changed its name to The Boston Journal.

In October 1917 John H. Higgins, the publisher and treasurer of the Boston Herald, bought out its nearby neighbor The Boston Journal and created The Boston Herald and Boston Journal.

Former contributors
 Charles Carleton Coffin, war correspondent who wrote dispatches from the front under the byline "Carlton".
 Stephen O'Meara, reporter (1874–1879), city editor (1879–1881), managing editor (1881–1895), general manager (1891–1895), editor-in-chief and publisher (1895–1899), and majority owner (1899–1902). Later served as the first commissioner of the Boston Police Department.
 Thomas Freeman Porter
 Benjamin Perley Poore, Washington correspondent and war correspondent who wrote under the byline "Perley".
 John Sherburne Sleeper, principal editor and part owner of the newspaper.  Sleeper wrote the Journals "Tales of the Seas" under his nom de plume of Hawser Martingale.

Images

References

External links

 Bostonian Society. Photo of billboards hanging from the Boston Journal Building at 264 Washington Street, April 1898

19th century in Boston
Defunct companies based in Massachusetts
Defunct newspapers published in Massachusetts
Newspapers published in Boston
Publications disestablished in 1917
Publications established in 1833
Boston Herald